The Scottish Rally Championship is a rallying series run throughout Scotland over the course of a year, that comprises seven gravel surface events.

The 2019 series began on the snow-covered forest tracks around Inverness on 9 February, with the season finale taking place around Dalbeattie on 14 September.

Following the Grampian Stages Rally in August, Euan Thorburn and regular co-driver Paul Beaton were declared champions in their Ford Focus WRC. They had won four of the five events thus far and were uncatchable in the points table.

2019 calendar
For season 2019 there are to be seven events held predominantly on gravel surfaces.

Snowman Rally
On 7 February it was announced via the organisers Facebook account that the 2019 event would be cancelled. The reason given was attributed to the extremely unsafe conditions of the course, with all stages having a thick covering of Ice.

2019 events podium

Drivers Points Classification

Points are awarded to the highest placed registered driver on each event as follows: 30, 28, 27, 26, and so on down to 1 point. 
At the end of the Championship, competitors will count their best 5 scores out of the 6 events as his/her final overall Championship score.

References

External links
 
 RSAC Scottish Rally Homepage

Scottish Rally Championship seasons
Scottish Rally Championship
Scottish Rally Championship
Scottish Rally Championship